Silon may refer to:

 A man-in-the-browser threat on Windows
 A polyamide polymer fibre developed by Otto Wichterle and others in the 1940s

See also
 Silonia
 Silone, a surname